DC vs. Marvel Comics was a 1996 comic book limited series intercompany crossover. In addition to the comics and other promotional material, trading cards were released by Skybox in 1995 to preview this event.

Card types
The "DC Versus Marvel Comics" card set contained 100 normal cards (including checklist). The normal cards are divided into 4 basic types.

Rival cards depict one Marvel and one DC hero with similar powers battling. The text on the back also tells the story of how the Marvel Vs. DC crossover came to be, and how it progressed. The back also only contains a single "Artist" attribution, whereas other cards differentiate between who did pencils, inks, and CGI where applicable.

Hero cards show heroes from either Marvel or DC and having a red or blue back to the card respectively. Also the text on the back of the cards is written as though it is either Clark Kent (Superman) or Peter Parker (Spider-Man) speaking about the hero. Peter Parker (a Marvel character) talks about DC characters and Clark Kent (a DC character) talks about Marvel characters. The background on the back of a Hero cards is an indistinct explosion of some kind. Some, but not all, Hero cards also show a Marvel hero in a DC universe context (i.e. a location or holding an object specific to one universe) and the vice versa for DC characters.

Villain cards are laid out similar to Hero cards. They still have Clark Kent and Peter Parker text on the backs, with red and blue colors to show a villain's source universe, but the backs of the cards are slightly different. The background on the backs of a Villain card is a pair of evil-looking eyes. Similar to the Hero cards, some images show villains in contexts from their non-native universe.

Battles cards depict battles between a hero and another hero, a villain and another villain, or a hero and a villain. When it is a hero and a hero or villain and villain battling, it is similar to the Rival cards in that they share similar powers. When it is a hero and villain battling, it is often the case that the hero is battling the villain who is traditionally associated with the similar hero from the alternate universe. For instance Captain America battled Batman during the Marvel Vs. DC voting, and thus there is a card showing Captain America battle Batman's villain Bane.

The Marvel Vs. DC trading card set contained 4 types of chase cards.

18 Impact cards were divided into 2 sets of 9 cards which each made a 9 card combined image when placed in standard 9 card protective sleeves. Additionally these cards were embossed giving them a raised texture.

12 Holo F/X card feature images from the normal cards "Rivals" types, but with special translucent and reflective foil layered over top to accentuate features such as the energy coming from Silver Surfer in the Silver Surfer Vs. Green Lantern card. Only the number one card, Sabretooth vs Azrael is a new different image.

2 Mirage cards featured lenticular images which changed as they are moved. These were special in that they showed not only one Marvel and one DC character, they also showed the Amalgam character that the two would be combined into in the future Amalgam comics and cards. The Mirage cards show the overlays of Spider-Man/Super-Boy/Spider-Boy and Wolverine/Batman/Dark Claw.

4 Amalgam Preview cards were also randomly inserted into packs. These cards were of the same style as the soon-to-be-released Amalgam card set. Two cards were of Dark Claw and two cards of Spider-Boy.

Trading cards
Works based on DC Comics
Works based on Marvel Comics
Amalgam Comics